Mark Wilson (born 1984) is a Northern Irish lawn bowler.

Bowls career
Wilson is a three time National Champion, winning a singles and two pairs titles at the Irish National Bowls Championships. In 2017, he won three medals at the European Bowls Championships, he had previously won a bronze in 2013 at the Championships.

In 2019, he won the fours bronze medal at the Atlantic Bowls Championships and in 2020 he was selected for the 2020 World Outdoor Bowls Championship in Australia.

References

Male lawn bowls players from Northern Ireland
1984 births
Living people
Bowls European Champions